Munford is a town in Talladega County, Alabama, United States. At the 2020 census, the population was 1,351. It is the location of what has been called the last battle of the Civil War east of the Mississippi, the Battle of Munford on April 23, 1865, being one week after the Battle of Columbus (April 16, 1865) in Georgia. The battle was responsible for the last Confederate death east of the Mississippi River, whose name was Andrew Jackson Buttram.

History
Munford was initially incorporated in 1873. At some point in the 1880s, it either disincorporated or lost its charter. In 2000, Munford was classified as a census-designated place (CDP), and in 2002 formally incorporated again. Munford is also known for its importance in the American Civil War, where the Battle of Munford took place on April 23, 1865. The battle is considered to be the last battle of the war east of the Mississippi River. One of the last Confederate casualties of the war occurred here, as well.

Geography

Demographics

2020 census

As of the 2020 United States census, there were 1,351 people, 562 households, and 405 families residing in the town.

2010 census
As of the census of 2010 there were 1,292 people, 492 households, and 355 families residing in the town. The racial makeup of the CDP was 82.4% White, 15.6% Black or African American, 0.5% Native American, 0.1% some other race, and 1.3% from two or more races. 1.0% of the population were Hispanic or Latino of any race.

There were 492 households, out of which 40.2% had children under the age of 18 living with them, 49.0% were headed by married couples living together, 17.1% had a female householder with no husband present, and 27.8% were non-families. 24.0% of all households were made up of individuals, and 9.3% were someone living alone who was 65 years of age or older. The average household size was 2.63, and the average family size was 3.11.

In the town, the population was spread out, with 26.6% under the age of 18, 9.1% from 18 to 24, 26.6% from 25 to 44, 25.3% from 45 to 64, and 12.4% who were 65 years of age or older. The median age was 37.1 years. For every 100 females, there were 87.2 males. For every 100 females age 18 and over, there were 84.8 males.

For the period 2007–2011, the estimated median annual income for a household in the town was $46,875, and the median income for a family was $50,278. Male full-time workers had a median income of $28,558 versus $25,809 for females. The per capita income for the CDP was $20,964. About 24.5 of families and 19.9% of the population were below the poverty line, including 32.8% of those under age 18 and 5.8% of those age 65 or over.

Notable people
 Donald Stewart, U.S. Senator from 1978 to 1981

References

Towns in Alabama
Former census-designated places in Alabama
Towns in Talladega County, Alabama